John William Ferrell (born July 16, 1967) is an American actor, comedian, writer, and producer. Ferrell first established himself in the mid-1990s as a cast member on the NBC sketch comedy series Saturday Night Live, where he performed from 1995 to 2002, and has subsequently starred in comedy films such as Elf (2003), Anchorman: The Legend of Ron Burgundy (2004), Kicking & Screaming (2005), Talladega Nights: The Ballad of Ricky Bobby (2006), Semi-Pro (2008), Step Brothers (2008), and Land of the Lost (2009). He founded the comedy website Funny or Die in 2007 with his writing partner Adam McKay. Other notable film roles include The Other Guys (2010), The Campaign (2012), Get Hard (2015), Holmes & Watson (2018), and the animated films Curious George (2006), Megamind (2010) and The Lego Movie film franchise (2014–2019).

Ferrell is considered a member of the "Frat Pack", a generation of leading Hollywood comic actors who emerged in the late 1990s and the 2000s, including Jack Black, Ben Stiller, Steve Carell, Vince Vaughn, Paul Rudd, and brothers Owen and Luke Wilson. He received an Emmy Award nomination for his work on Saturday Night Live, and three Golden Globe Award nominations for acting in The Producers (2005) and Stranger than Fiction (2006) and for producing Vice (2018). He was also named the best comedian of 2015 in the British GQ Men of the Year awards. Ferrell received a star on the Hollywood Walk of Fame on March 24, 2015.

Early life
Ferrell was born on July 16, 1967, in Irvine, California, to Betty Kay (née Overman; born 1940), a teacher who taught at Old Mill School elementary school and Santa Ana College, and Roy Lee Ferrell Jr. (born 1941), who played saxophone and keyboards for the Righteous Brothers. His parents were both natives of Roanoke Rapids, North Carolina. They moved to California in 1964. Ferrell's ancestry includes English, German, and Irish. As an infant Ferrell suffered from pyloric stenosis and had a pyloromyotomy to correct the condition. He has a younger brother, Patrick.

When he was eight years old, his parents divorced. Ferrell said of the divorce: "I was the type of kid who would say, 'Hey, look at the bright side! We'll have two Christmases'." The divorce was amicable, and both parents were committed to their children. The biggest problem was his father's line of work. As a person in show business, his paychecks were never steady, and he traveled from home for months at a time. Growing up in this environment made Ferrell not want to go into show business and instead have a steady job.

Ferrell first attended school at Culverdale Elementary and later attended Rancho San Joaquin Middle School, both in Irvine. He attended University High School in Irvine, and was a kicker for the school's varsity football team. He was also on the soccer team and captain of the basketball team, as well as serving on the student council. Ferrell called third grade "a pivotal year." He realized he could make his classmates laugh if he pretended to smash his head against the wall, or if he tripped and fell on purpose, and said it was a great way to make friends. He said the dullness of Irvine contributed to the growth of his humor:

In his senior year of high school, Ferrell and a friend would perform comedy skits over the school's intercom system, with cooperation from the principal; the two had to write their own material. Ferrell also performed comedic skits in the school's talent shows. He was voted "Best Personality" by his classmates. He enrolled at the University of Southern California, where he studied sports broadcasting and joined the Delta Tau Delta fraternity. In college, he was known for a few pranks. On occasion, he would dress in a janitor's outfit and stroll into his friends' classes. He was also known for streaking around campus with a few other people from the Delta Tau Delta fraternity. Ferrell earned an internship at a local television station in the sports department, but he did not enjoy the work.

After graduating with a B.A. degree in sports information in 1990, he knew he did not want to do broadcasting. He took up a job as a hotel valet where, on his second day, he tore a baggage rack off the top of a van by trying to drive it under a low beam. He also worked as a teller at Wells Fargo, but came up short $300 the first day and $280 the second; he was not stealing the money, but was just careless and error-prone. In 1991, encouraged by his mother to pursue something he liked, Ferrell moved to Los Angeles. He successfully auditioned for the comedy group The Groundlings where he spent time developing his improvisation skills.

Career

The Groundlings

Before joining The Groundlings, Ferrell's attempts at standup comedy had little success. He started in the advanced classes and grew to love improvisation. He realized he also liked to impersonate people, and one of his favorites was Harry Caray, the Hall of Fame baseball announcer. Soon he began to create original characters, and by 1994 he had joined The Groundlings. With fellow Groundlings member Chris Kattan, he created the Butabi Brothers, who go out to dance clubs to try to pick up women but are constantly rejected. While taking classes, Ferrell got a job at an auction house via his friend Viveca Paulin. The job was ideal as it was flexible enough for him to audition and go to rehearsals while also being employed. By 1995 he was receiving small roles, including appearances in TV series Grace Under Fire and Living Single, low-budget films such as A Bucket of Blood, as well as commercials. One winter, he served as a mall Santa Claus.

Saturday Night Live
After SNL's decline in popularity in 1994–1995, and in need of new cast members for the next season, a producer saw The Groundlings and asked Ferrell, Kattan, and Cheri Oteri to audition for SNL's main producer, Lorne Michaels. Ferrell joined Saturday Night Live in 1995 and left in 2002 after a seven-year tenure. He has hosted the show five times, thereby becoming a member of the show's Five Timers Club.

During his time on SNL, Ferrell made a name for himself with his impersonations, which included US President George W. Bush, Chicago Cubs announcer Harry Caray, singer Robert Goulet (crooning a cappella pieces of music by Sisqó, Baha Men, and The Notorious B.I.G.), singer Neil Diamond, Inside the Actors Studio host James Lipton (who favored Ferrell's impersonation), Massachusetts Senator Ted Kennedy, United States Attorney General Janet Reno, convicted Unabomber Ted Kaczynski, game show host Alex Trebek, fictitious private detective John Shaft, professional wrestler Jesse Ventura, US Vice President Al Gore, Iraqi President Saddam Hussein, and Cuban President Fidel Castro.

His original characters included Morning Latte co-host Tom Wilkins, Mister Ed the Horse's twin brother Ned, fictional Blue Öyster Cult member Gene Frenkle (physically modeled after the band's vocalist Eric Bloom), music teacher Marty Culp, cheerleader Craig Buchanan, Dale Sturtevant from Dissing Your Dog, Hank of the Bill Brasky Buddies, David Leary from Dog Show, angry and inattentive Dr. Beaman and night clubber Steve Butabi in sketches that were turned into a feature film in 1998's A Night at the Roxbury. Although a one-shot character, one of Ferrell's most memorable SNL characters is Dale McGrew, a "highly patriotic" office worker who comes to work wearing a half t-shirt and short shorts that Ferrell improvised into a thong just before the skit aired live, leading to genuine laughter from the cast and guest host Seann William Scott. Ferrell became the highest paid cast member of Saturday Night Live in 2001 with a season salary of $350,000.

Ferrell returned to Saturday Night Live as a guest host on May 14, 2005; May 16, 2009; May 12, 2012; January 27, 2018, and November 23, 2019. For the first two hosting appearances, he reprised his role as Alex Trebek in the "Celebrity Jeopardy" sketches. On the May 14 appearance, Ferrell reprised his role as Robert Goulet in a fake commercial advertising a series of ringtones and, during the performance of the song "Little Sister" by musical guests Queens of the Stone Age, Ferrell came on stage playing the cowbell.

In a 2014 poll taken as part of a commemorative SNL feature on Grantland, Ferrell was voted the best Saturday Night Live cast member of all time.

On December 12, 2015, Ferrell appeared in the cold open of the show in character as George W. Bush. He reprised this role when he returned as host in 2018.

Film career

During his time on Saturday Night Live, Ferrell appeared in several movies: Austin Powers: International Man of Mystery, A Night at the Roxbury, Superstar, The Ladies Man, Dick, Drowning Mona, Austin Powers: The Spy Who Shagged Me, Jay and Silent Bob Strike Back, and Zoolander.

His first starring role after his departure from Saturday Night Live was as Frank "The Tank" Richard in Old School (2003). The film "belongs to Mr. Ferrell," declared The New York Times, which described how he "uses his hilarious, anxious zealotry to sell the part." Old School was a success and Ferrell received an MTV Movie Awards nomination for Best Comedic Performance.

The title role in Elf (2003) followed, as did another MTV Movie Awards nomination. Ferrell continued to land comedy roles in 2004 and 2005 in films such as Melinda and Melinda, Anchorman: The Legend of Ron Burgundy, and Starsky & Hutch earning himself a place among Hollywood's Frat Pack. In 2005, Ferrell earned . In 2006, Ferrell starred in Stranger Than Fiction and Talladega Nights: The Ballad of Ricky Bobby. Both received critical and box office success. Ferrell's performance in Stranger Than Fiction introduced audiences to the dramatic potential of Ferrell's acting talents, while Talladega Nights was his highest grossing live-action opening as of 2010 at $47 million. On , 2006, The Magazine named Ferrell as one of its three actors of the year in their 2006 year in review issue. A sequel to Anchorman, Anchorman 2: The Legend Continues, was released in 2013.

In 2008, Ferrell starred in the movie Step Brothers with John C. Reilly. It was directed by frequent Ferrell collaborator Adam McKay, who was also a co-writer of the movie. The movie earned $128 million worldwide.

Ferrell appeared as part of a pre-game video package for the Rose Bowl along with University of Texas at Austin alum Matthew McConaughey. Ferrell sang a song at the ESPY Awards in 2006 about Lance Armstrong and Neil Armstrong. He and John C. Reilly performed a spot during the 2008 ESPY Awards within which they made demands in order for them to appear at the ESPYs, such as asking Portland Trail Blazers' center Greg Oden to tuck them in at night and tell them stories of the old times or to bring back the Cold War so the Olympics can be interesting again.

Ferrell participated in a 79th Academy Awards musical-comedy performance with John C. Reilly and Jack Black, wherein they sang a song about comedies being snubbed by the voters in favor of dramas.

In May 2009, it was announced that Ferrell was in talks to star in a feature film, Neighborhood Watch (later The Watch), a comedy about an urbanite who moves to the suburbs and uncovers a conspiracy. In negotiations to direct was David Dobkin, who gave Ferrell a cameo in Wedding Crashers. In August 2009, Ferrell decided not to do the film.

Ferrell starred in the feature film Land of the Lost (2009). It was a commercial and critical flop, earning  on opening weekend—about two-thirds of what the studio expected. In 2010, he was the executive producer and star of The Other Guys, a buddy cop film which also has an ensemble cast including Mark Wahlberg, Eva Mendes, Michael Keaton, Steve Coogan, Ray Stevenson, Samuel L. Jackson, and Dwayne Johnson. The film was a commercial success earning over $140 million and was positively reviewed by critics.

Ferrell appeared in the 2011 music video for "Make Some Noise" by the Beastie Boys, in the front of a limo playing a cowbell. He stars in Casa de Mi Padre, a telenovela spoof comedy set in a ranch with Mexican stars Diego Luna and Gael García Bernal. The movie is told in melodramatic telenovela form and features English-language subtitles. He starred alongside Zach Galifianakis in the 2012 political comedy The Campaign, which garnered mediocre reviews and grossed $104 million against a budget of $95 million. Also in 2012, he appeared in the comedy Tim and Eric's Billion Dollar Movie and starred as Armando Álvarez in the Spanish-language comedy Casa de Mi Padre which was directed by frequent collaborator Matt Piedmont.

Ferrell and Red Hot Chili Peppers drummer Chad Smith, who have had a long-running joke feud over their similar appearance appeared on the May 22, 2014 episode of The Tonight Show Starring Jimmy Fallon for a charity drum-off battle. Despite Smith clearly giving the better performance, Ferrell was named the winner and awarded a giant gold cowbell. Both were joined by Smith's Red Hot Chili Peppers bandmates for a performance of "Don't Fear the Reaper," with Ferrell playing cowbell. On June 10, 2014, Ferrell and Smith challenged Metallica drummer Lars Ulrich to a drum-off with Ferrell, saying Ulrich looks "eerily similar" to the two of them. Ulrich accepted the challenge two days later.

In 2015, he starred in the buddy comedy Get Hard and the comedy Daddy's Home, with the latter reuniting him The Other Guys co-star Mark Wahlberg. He reprised his role, Jacobim Mugatu, in the Zoolander sequel, Zoolander 2 (2016).

His film projects include the comedy-drama Zeroville (2016), based on the novel of the same name; and portraying director Russ Meyer in Russ and Roger Go Beyond (2017), a comedic biopic documenting the making of Beyond the Valley of the Dolls, which was written by film critic Roger Ebert (played by Josh Gad).

Voice acting

Ferrell has worked as a voice actor in several animated television programs and films, including his portrayal of Bob Oblong, a 1950s-style father with no arms or legs, in the short-lived animated television series The Oblongs. He has had several guest appearances on Family Guy where he played the Black Knight in "Mr. Saturday Knight," as well as Fat Greek Guy and Miles "Chatterbox" Musket in Fifteen Minutes of Shame. Ferrell also starred as Ted (a.k.a. The Man in the Yellow Hat) in the film Curious George and guest voiced on an episode of the FOX sitcom King of the Hill as a politically correct soccer coach. He voiced the title character in the 2010 DreamWorks Animation feature film Megamind (replacing both Robert Downey Jr., who dropped out due to scheduling conflicts, and Ben Stiller, who also turned down the role and was instead cast in a minor role as Bernard the curator) as well as President Business in The Lego Movie, released in 2014. He reprised the latter role in The Lego Movie 2: The Second Part, released in 2019.

Stage career
Ferrell made his Broadway debut taking on departing U.S. President George W. Bush in a one-man show called You're Welcome America. A Final Night with George W. Bush. The limited engagement played through , 2009.

Podcasting 
In February 2019, Ferrell launched The Ron Burgundy Podcast  in collaboration with the iHeart Radio Podcast Network.  The show was originally slated for two seasons of twelve episodes each. In 2022, the podcast was renewed for a fifth live season.

In October 2019, Ferrell partnered with iHeart Radio to launch his own podcast network, the Big Money Players Network. The partnership deal included 10 scripted and unscripted comedy podcasts set to be released over a two-year period.

Baseball

On May 6, 2010, at a Minor League Baseball game at Dell Diamond in Round Rock, Texas, Ferrell was introduced between innings as a Venezuelan pitcher for the Round Rock Express named "Billy Ray 'RoJo' Johnson". Wearing a false mustache and carrying a bag of beer cans to the mound, Ferrell threw one pitch and was ejected after a staged fight and chase with an opposing batter. He revealed himself to the fans when his moustache fell off during the chase. Video of the skit went viral. The appearance was cooked up by Ferrell and the Express, who sent out a press release announcing Johnson's "signing" to promote a charity golf outing the following day at a nearby country club.

Ferrell played in five games of Major League Baseball spring training on March 12, 2015, for ten different Cactus League teams as a promotion for a Funny or Die charity special. He played for the Arizona Diamondbacks, Los Angeles Angels, Los Angeles Dodgers, San Diego Padres, Cincinnati Reds, Oakland Athletics, Seattle Mariners, Chicago Cubs, Chicago White Sox, and the San Francisco Giants, playing all ten positions including designated hitter. According to Baseball-Reference, Ferrell faced and retired one batter – pitching on behalf of the Dodgers and ending with a 0.00 earned run average. The memorabilia from his one-day professional baseball career was sold and the proceeds donated to two cancer charities. Ferrell went 0–2 with two strikeouts over the day, but managed to foul off a 92 mph fastball from the Giants' Jean Machi.

Soccer
Ferrell took part in Soccer Aid 2012. In 2016, he became a part-owner of Los Angeles FC, which competes in the MLS. When asked about why he became a co-owner Ferrell said "I don't really have a side per se until LAFC get started and that will definitely be, obviously, my team. But I just enough watching the fact that it's played all over the world. So many amazing players and so many top flight leagues. And hopefully MLS can be on par, eventually, with the European leagues."

Creating and producing
In April 2007, Ferrell and Adam McKay launched "Funny or Die", a streaming video website where short comedy films are uploaded and voted on by users. One of the featured shorts, The Landlord, stars Ferrell as a man harassed for the rent by his landlady, a swearing, beer-loving, two-year-old girl, played by McKay's own daughter, Pearl. Child psychologists have criticized Ferrell and the McKay family for child exploitation, to which McKay responded, "Fortunately she is in this great stage now where she repeats anything you say to her and then forgets it right away, which is key. She has not said the 'B-word' since we shot the thing."
They followed with the release of a video entitled "Good Cop, Baby Cop" which also starred baby Pearl; the end of the video stated that this would be her final appearance and wished her a happy "baby retirement".

In September 2008, Ferrell released another video entitled "Will Ferrell Answers Internet Questions" where he takes some pressing questions and comments from his fans. Another Ferrell appearance on "Funny or Die" is in the video called "Green Team", featuring also McKay and John C. Reilly. It shows militant ecologic activists terrorizing the crew on a filming set.

Ferrell co-produced (with Adam McKay) an HBO show starring Danny McBride called Eastbound & Down. He also had a recurring role as car dealer Ashley Schaeffer.

Ferrell was one of the executive producers of The Chris Gethard Show, which aired on Fusion from 2015 to 2016 and on truTV from 2017 to 2018.

Ferrell is one of the executive producers of Dead to Me (2019–2022), which stars Christina Applegate and Linda Cardellini.

Personal life
In August 2000, Ferrell married Swedish actress Viveca Paulin, whom he met in 1995 at an acting class. They live in New York City and also Orange County, California, and have three sons, born in 2004, 2006, and 2010.

At USC, Ferrell was a member of Delta Tau Delta fraternity and is now an active alumnus. Ferrell has worked with former head coach Pete Carroll to do motivational stunts for the players during the season. 

Ferrell has participated in marathons including the Boston, New York, and the Stockholm marathons. He also raises money for charity, including his Scholarships for Cancer Survivors campaign through a micro-donations fundraising platform.

In 2007, Autograph magazine named Ferrell the worst celebrity autographer. Its editor stated: "What's so frustrating about Will Ferrell being the worst autograph signer this past year is that he used to be so nice to fans and collectors and a great signer. What makes him so bad is that he'll taunt people asking for his autograph." In response, Ferrell stated: "I don't know how I got on the list. I sign a lot of autographs." He has, however, admitted to taunting autograph-seekers: "I do. I really do. I'm like, 'How badly do you want this autograph?' 'Are you sure?' 'You say you're my biggest fan, really, prove it.' I'll do things like that. They have to earn it."

Ferrell had noted that, although he was well known for his SNL impersonation of President George W. Bush, he chose, for both professional and political reasons not to meet the President on several occasions, unlike his SNL predecessor Dana Carvey's famous relationship with George H. W. Bush: "I declined, partly out of comedic purposes, because when I was on the show Saturday Night Live at the time, it didn't make sense to really meet the people that you play, for fear of them influencing you. And then the other side of it is, from a political standpoint, I don't want to meet that guy." 

Ferrell appeared on an episode of Man vs. Wild, where he traveled throughout the tundras of Sweden with the show's host, Bear Grylls. In the episode, Ferrell came across various unique situations which included eating the eye of a reindeer.

In August 2012, while in Australia promoting The Campaign, Ferrell made a guest appearance on the channel 10 live panel news/comedy show The Project. He found himself speaking via video link to Australian Prime Minister Julia Gillard, during which they had a humorous conversation about hairdressing. Ferrell supported Barack Obama in the 2012 presidential election and met him (along with his wife, Michelle) in 2011. In February 2013, Ferrell endorsed Eric Garcetti for mayor of Los Angeles.

On January 7, 2016, it was announced that Ferrell would become a part-owner of Los Angeles FC, a Major League Soccer team set to begin playing in 2018, one of several celebrity owners of the team alongside Mia Hamm and Magic Johnson.

On May 12, 2017, Ferrell was awarded an honorary D.H.L. degree by the University of Southern California.

On April 13, 2018, Ferrell was involved in a serious two-car collision in California, where he was riding in an SUV that flipped over. Ferrell was one of three passengers in the car. He was seen talking on his cell phone while being loaded into an ambulance. Ferrell, along with another passenger was unhurt in the accident, although two others were injured. He was released from the hospital shortly after, said to be "doing fine."

Filmography

Awards and honours

Over his career Ferrell has received various awards nominations including sixteen Primetime Emmy Award nominations winning three awards, one for Succession (2020), and twice for Live in Front of a Studio Audience (2019, 2020).
Ferrell received two Golden Globe Award nominations for his comedian performances in The Producers (2005), and Stranger than Fiction (2006). He also received a Tony Award nomination for Best Special Theatrical Event for You're Welcome America. A Final Night with George W Bush (2009).

Ferrell also has received various honors including the James Joyce Award from the University College Dublin's Literary and Historical Society in recognition for "excelling in his field" in 2008. In 2011 he was awarded the Mark Twain Prize for American Humor. Ferrell received the prize at a ceremony at the John F. Kennedy Center for the Performing Arts where he was honored by fellow comedians and collaborators Conan O'Brien, John C. Reilly, Ben Stiller, Jack Black, Paul Rudd, Adam McKay, Tim Meadows, Matthew Broderick, and Ed Asner. In 2015, Ferrell received a Star on the Hollywood Walk of Fame for his work in motion pictures.

In 2022, Los Angeles F.C. of Major League Soccer (MLS) – of which Ferrell is part owner – won the MLS Cup, thus giving him an MLS championship to his credit.

References

Sources

External links

 
Will Ferrell page on Funny Or Die

 
1967 births
Living people
20th-century American comedians
21st-century American comedians
20th-century American male actors
21st-century American male actors
American people of English descent
American people of Irish descent
American people of German descent
American impressionists (entertainers)
American male comedians
American male film actors
American male television actors
American male voice actors
American male screenwriters
American soccer chairmen and investors
American television writers
American film producers
Film producers from California
Funny or Die
Male actors from Orange County, California
Mark Twain Prize recipients
People from Irvine, California
Television producers from California
USC Annenberg School for Communication and Journalism alumni
American sketch comedians
American male television writers
Comedians from California
Screenwriters from California
Frat Pack